Marvin Leonard Kalb (born June 9, 1930) is an American journalist. He was the founding director of the Shorenstein Center on Media, Politics and Public Policy and Edward R. Murrow Professor of Press and Public Policy from 1987 to 1999. The Shorenstein Center and the Kennedy School are part of Harvard University. Kalb is currently a James Clark Welling Fellow at George Washington University and a member of the Atlantic Community Advisory Board. He is a guest scholar in foreign policy at the Brookings Institution.

Career
Kalb spent 30 years as an award-winning reporter for CBS News and NBC News. Kalb was the last newsman recruited by Edward R. Murrow to join CBS News, becoming part of the later generation of the "Murrow Boys." His work at CBS landed him on Richard Nixon's "enemies list". At NBC, he served as chief diplomatic correspondent and host of Meet the Press. During many years of Kalb's tenures at CBS and NBC, his brother Bernard worked alongside him.

Kalb has authored or coauthored many nonfiction books (Eastern Exposure, Dragon in the Kremlin, The Volga, Roots of Involvement, Kissinger, Campaign ’88, The Nixon Memo and One Scandalous Story) and two best-selling novels (In the National Interest and The Last Ambassador). His book, The Year I was Peter the Great, was published on October 10, 2017. Most recently, his book Enemy of the People: Trump's War on the Press, the New McCarthyism, and the Threat to American Democracy, was published by the Brookings Institution Press in 2018.His latest book is 'Assignment Russia' (2021) also published by Brookings.

Kalb hosts The Kalb Report, a monthly discussion of media ethics and responsibility at the National Press Club in Washington, D.C. sponsored by George Washington University.  He was a news analyst for Fox News, and is a contributor to National Public Radio and America Abroad. He is currently a senior adviser at the Pulitzer Center on Crisis Reporting.

Haunting Legacy
In Haunting Legacy: Vietnam and the American Presidency from Ford to Obama (Brookings Institution Press 2011), Marvin Kalb collaborated with his daughter, Deborah Kalb, in an attempt to present a history of presidential decision-making on one crucial issue: in light of the Vietnam debacle, under what circumstances should the United States go to war? The Kalbs participated in a webcast interview of the book at the Pritzker Military Library on October 27, 2011.

Partial bibliography
 Enemy of the People: Trump's War on the Press, the New McCarthyism, and the Threat to American Democracy (2018), Brookings Institution Press, 
 The Year I Was Peter the Great: 1956—Khrushchev, Stalin’s Ghost, and a Young American in Russia (2017), Brookings Institution Press, 
 Imperial Gamble: Putin, Ukraine, and the New Cold War (2015), Brookings Institution Press, .
 The Road to War: Presidential Commitments Honored and Betrayed (2013), Brookings Institution Press, .
 Haunting Legacy: Vietnam and the American Presidency from Ford to Obama (2011), Brookings Institution Press, .
 The Media and the War on Terrorism (2003), Brookings Institution Press, .
 One Scandalous Story: Clinton, Lewinsky, and Thirteen Days That Tarnished American Journalism (2001)
 The Nixon Memo: Political Respectability, Russia, and the Press (1994)
 The Last Ambassador (1981)
 In the National Interest (1977)
 Kissinger (1974)
 Roots of Involvement: the U.S. in Asia, 1784–1971 (1971)
 Dragon in the Kremlin: A Report on the Russian-Chinese Alliance (1961)

Trivia
Kalb's colleagues at NBC had a running joke involving an NBC affiliate in Alexandria, Louisiana – KALB-TV, referring to that affiliate as "Marvin's Station". At one point, Today co-host Bryant Gumbel, in a co-op promo for the station's upcoming feature about Today in 1985, identified the station as KALB, smiled into the camera, and then intoned, "Marvin's Station" at which point the off-camera crew broke up.

Former Fox News political commentator Bill O'Reilly was one of Kalb's students.

See also
Enemy of the people
McCarthyism

References

External links
 About Marvin Kalb at The Kalb Report from the George Washington University website
 Marvin Kalb's Profile at Harvard University from the John F. Kennedy School of Government website
 Marvin Kalb's Expert Page at The Brookings Institution from The Brookings Institution website
 Reagan Mondale debate October 21, 1984 on Wikimedia Commons
 

Harvard Fellows
Harvard Kennedy School faculty
American television reporters and correspondents
American foreign policy writers
American male non-fiction writers
American journalism academics
Living people
1930 births
CBS News people
City College of New York alumni
Harvard University alumni
NBC News people
American television news anchors
20th-century American Jews
21st-century American Jews